Tyrrell or Tyrell may refer to:

Places
 Tyrrell, Ohio
 Tyrrell County, North Carolina
 Tyrrell Sea, prehistoric Hudson Bay

People
 Tyrrell (surname)
 Tyrell Biggs (born 1960), American boxer
 Tyrell Terry (born 2000), American basketball player

Fictional characters
 House Tyrell, in the A Song of Ice and Fire fantasy novel series by George R. R. Martin
 Margaery Tyrell
 Olenna Tyrell
 Mace Tyrell
 Loras Tyrell
 Eldon Tyrell, founder and CEO of Tyrell Corporation in the Blade Runner universe
 Dorian Tyrell, the antagonist of the 1994 film The Mask
  Tyrell, a villain in the graphic novel Superman: Earth One
  Tyrell Wellick, a character in the series Mr. Robot

Other uses
 Royal Tyrrell Museum of Palaeontology
 Tyrrell Middle School, a secondary school in Wolcott, Connecticut
 Tyrrell Racing, an auto racing team and Formula One constructor
 Tyrrells (crisps), a manufacturer of potato crisps in the United Kingdom
 Tyrell BrauKunstAtelier, brewery for ageable beer specialities in Berlin, Germany

See also
Tyrel (disambiguation)
Terrell (disambiguation)
Terrill